Ossi Oswalda (born Oswalda Amalie Anna Stäglich, 2 February 1898 – 7 March 1947) was a German actress, who mostly appeared in silent films. She was given the nickname 'The German Mary Pickford' due to her popularity at the time.

Biography
Oswalda Amalie Anna Stäglich was born on 2 February 1898, the daughter of Pauline Marie Anna Stäglich. Oswalda trained as a ballerina and became a dancer for a theater in Berlin. She made her film debut in Richard Oswald's Nächte des Grauens (Night of Horrors) before being discovered by the actor and screenwriter Hanns Kräly, who in turn recommended her to director Ernst Lubitsch. During her early career, she starred in several films by Lubitsch, including The Merry Jail, I Don't Want to Be a Man, The Oyster Princess and The Doll. Her popularity at the time earned her the nickname 'The German Mary Pickford'.

In 1921, Oswalda started her own film production company with her husband at the time, the Hungarian Baron Gustav Wilhelm Viktor Freiherr von Koczian-Miskolczy. However, during the next four years they only produced four films, all starring Oswalda. From 1925 on, she was contracted to Ufa. The couple divorced in 1925, and Oswalda began a high-profile affair with Wilhelm, German Crown Prince.

Oswalda's career waned along with the silent film era, and she only acted in two sound films, making her final appearance on screen in the 1933 film The Star of Valencia. She escaped Nazi Germany and emigrated to Prague with her partner Julius Außenberg in the 1930s.

Later on, she became a stage actor, and in 1943, wrote the screenplay for the Czechoslovakian film Čtrnáctý u stolu. By spring 1947, Oswalda went bankrupt and was suffering from multiple health problems.

At the age of 49, Oswalda died penniless in Prague, where she is buried at Olsany Cemetery.

Filmography

 Nächte des Grauens (1916)
 Shoe Palace Pinkus (1916)
 Der Hilferuf (1916)
 Leutnant auf Befehl (1916)
 Der Tod auf Zeche Silva (1916)
 Der G.m.b.H.-Tenor (1916)
 Das fidele Gefängnis (The Merry Jail, 1917)
 Ossi's Tagebuch (1917)
 When Four Do the Same (1917)
 Prinz Sami (1917)
 Dem Licht entgegen (1918)
 The Ballet Girl (1918)
The Toboggan Cavalier (1918)
 I Don't Want to Be a Man (1918)
 The Swabian Maiden (1919)
 My Wife, the Movie Star (1919)
 Das Mädchen aus dem Wilden Westen (1919)
 Das Millionenmädel (1919)
 Meyer from Berlin (1919)
 The Oyster Princess (1919)
 The Doll (1919)
 Hundemamachen (1920)
 The Housing Shortage (1920)
 Kakadu und Kiebitz (1920)
 Putschliesel (1920)
 Love at the Wheel (1921)
 The Girl with the Mask (1922)
 Das Milliardensouper (1923)
 Ein Weihnachtsfilm für Große (1924)
 Colibri (1924)
 Niniche (1925)
 Express Train of Love (1925)
 The Girl with a Patron (1925)
 The Adventure of Mr. Philip Collins (1925)
 Countess Ironing-Maid (1926)
 The Wooing of Eve (1926)
 Darling, Count the Cash (1926)
 The Little Variety Star (1926)
 The Girl on a Swing (1926)
 A Crazy Night (1927)
 A Serious Case (1927)
 Floretta and Patapon (1927)
 It Attracted Three Fellows (1928)
 The Weekend Bride (1928)
 Eddy Polo mit Pferd und Lasso (1928)
 The House Without Men (1928)
 Sir or Madam (1928)
 Der Dieb im Schlafcoupée (1929)
 The Fourth from the Right (1929)
 Josef the Chaste (1930)
 The Star of Valencia (1933)

References

External links

Photographs and literature
 Find a Grave on Olšany Cemetery from Ossi Oswalda

1898 births
1947 deaths
20th-century German actresses

Actresses from Berlin

Burials at Olšany Cemetery

German stage actresses

German film actresses
German silent film actresses